Caniche Peak is located on the border of Alberta and British Columbia. It was named in 1922 by Arthur O. Wheeler. He suggested it be called Poodle Park as he thought it resembled the head of a poodle. The French word for poodle, "Caniche", was adopted to give the name more class.

See also
List of peaks on the Alberta–British Columbia border
Mountains of Alberta
Mountains of British Columbia

References

Caniche Peak
Caniche Peak
Canadian Rockies